So Many Dreams is a 1986 East German drama film directed by Heiner Carow. It was entered into the 37th Berlin International Film Festival.

Cast
 Jutta Wachowiak as Christine
 Dagmar Manzel as Claudia
 Peter-René Lüdicke as Ludwig
 Heiko Hehlmann as Gunnar
 Gudrun Okras as Christines Mutter
 Heinz Hupfer as Christines Vater
 Thomas Hinrich as Hinrich
 Christine Harbort as James' Mutter
 Hans-Dieter Leuckert as James
 Christian Grashof as Professor Kühne
 Gerry Wolff as Oberbürgermeister
 Lydia Billiet as Die Fremde

References

External links

1986 films
East German films
1980s German-language films
1986 drama films
Films directed by Heiner Carow
1980s German films